Big Lagoon may refer to:
Big Lagoon (California), an enclosed bay on the Pacific coast of California
Big Lagoon, California, a community adjacent to the bay
Big Lagoon Rancheria, in California
Big Lagoon State Park, in Florida
Big Lagoon (New Zealand), at the mouth of the Wairau River